Metropolitan Natural Park (Parque Natural Metropolitano) is a park in Panama City, Panama.  It is the only wildlife refuge in the city.  Wildlife found in the park include bird species and Geoffroy's tamarin.  The park was first proposed in 1974 and was inaugurated on June 5, 1988.

References

Parks in Panama
Protected areas established in 1988
Tourist attractions in Panama City
Panama City